WPGT (90.1 FM) is a radio station licensed to serve the community of Lake City, Florida. The station is owned by Grace Church of Lake City Inc. It airs a religious format.

The station was assigned the WPGT call letters by the Federal Communications Commission on November 3, 2010.

References

External links
 Official Website
 

Radio stations established in 2013
2013 establishments in Florida
Lake City, Florida
PGT (FM)